Arboys en Bugey (literally Arboys in Bugey) is a commune in the Ain department of eastern France. It was incorporated on January 1, 2016 in the amalgamation of the former communes of Arbignieu and Saint-Bois.

See also 
Communes of the Ain department

References 

Communes of Ain
Communes nouvelles of Ain
Populated places established in 2016
2016 establishments in France
Ain communes articles needing translation from French Wikipedia